Cymindis vartianorum is a species of ground beetle in the subfamily Harpalinae. It was described by Mandl in 1973.

References

vartianorum
Beetles described in 1973